Montpelier High School may refer to:

 Montpelier High School, Bristol
 Montpelier High School (Ohio)
 Montpelier High School (Vermont)